The 13157 / 13158 Kolkata station–Muzaffarpur Junction Tirhut Express is a Express express train belonging to Indian Railways – Eastern Railway zone that runs between Kolkata Station and  in India. This is the most popular train for people travelling beyond Muzaffarpur to Kolkata.

It operates as train number 13157 from Kolkata station to Muzaffarpur Junction and as train number 13158 in the reverse direction, serving the states of Bihar, Jharkhand & West Bengal.

Service

Coaches

The 13157 / 13158 Kolkata station–Muzaffarpur Junction Tirhut Express consists with a total of 17 coaches of types AC 3-Tier, Sleeper, 2S (Reserved), General (unreserved). Sleeper Extra (SE) Coaches are attached during the time of festivals.

Routeing

The 13157 / 13158 Kolkata station–Muzaffarpur Junction Tirhut Express runs from Kolkata station via Naihati railway station →  →  →  →  →  →  →  →  →  →  →  to Muzaffarpur Junction.

Traction

The rest part of the journey is covered by an electric locomotive WAP-4 / WAM-4 / WAG-5.

Rake sharing

The trains shares its rake with

 13165/13166 Kolkata–Sitamarhi Express
 13159/13160 Kolkata–Jogbani Express
 13155/13156 Mithilanchal Express

See also
 Bagh Express
 Mithila Express
 Ganga Sagar Express

References

Transport in Kolkata
Transport in Muzaffarpur
Named passenger trains of India
Rail transport in Bihar
Rail transport in Jharkhand
Rail transport in West Bengal
Express trains in India